Yusuke Matsui (松井 佑介, born July 10, 1987, in Japan) is a Japanese former professional baseball outfielder who is currently coach for the Orix Buffaloes of Nippon Professional Baseball (NPB). He has played in NPB for the Chunichi Dragons and Buffaloes.

Career

On March 26, 2010, Matsui made his NPB debut.

On December 2, 2020, he become a free agent. On December 2, 2020, he become a batting coach for Buffaloes.

References

External links

1987 births
Living people
Baseball people from Osaka
Chunichi Dragons players
Japanese baseball coaches
Japanese baseball players
Nippon Professional Baseball coaches
Nippon Professional Baseball outfielders
Orix Buffaloes players